Samara da Silva Vieira (born 7 October 1991) is a Brazilian female handballer for Kastamonu and the Brazilian national team.

Achievements  
Romanian National League:
Winner: 2019
Romanian Cup:
Winner: 2022
Romanian Supercup:
Finalist: 2021
Brazilian National League:
Bronze Medalist: 2016
Brazilian Cup:
Silver Medalist: 2016
Bronze Medalist: 2015

Individual awards
 MVP of the Youth World Championship: 2008
 All-Star Centre Back of the Brazilian Cup: 2015 
 Gala Premiilor Handbalului Românesc Liga Națională Defensive Player of the Season: 2019

References

External links

 

1991 births
Living people
Brazilian female handball players
Expatriate handball players in Turkey
Brazilian expatriate sportspeople in Italy
Brazilian expatriate sportspeople in Spain
Brazilian expatriate sportspeople in Germany
Brazilian expatriate sportspeople in Turkey
Brazilian expatriate sportspeople in Romania
Brazilian expatriate sportspeople in Slovenia
SCM Râmnicu Vâlcea (handball) players
Handball players at the 2019 Pan American Games
Pan American Games medalists in handball
Pan American Games gold medalists for Brazil
People from Natal, Rio Grande do Norte
Medalists at the 2019 Pan American Games
Handball players at the 2020 Summer Olympics
Sportspeople from Rio Grande do Norte
21st-century Brazilian women